Mobo or MOBO may refer to:

Entertainment
 MOBO Awards, UK-based music awards
 Mobo, a band created by Kazumi Watanabe
 Modern Baseball, American rock band from Philadelphia

People
 Gao Mobo (born 1952), Chinese-born Australian sinologist
 Lesley Mobo (born 1982), Filipino fashion designer
 Moritz Böhringer (born 1993), American football player for the Minnesota Vikings

Places
 Mobo, Kalibo, a municipality in Aklan, Philippines
 Mobo, Masbate, a municipality in Masbate, Philippines

Terms and slang
 Mobo, slang for motherboard
 Japanese modern boys, the masculine version of the Westernized modern girl